The 2017–18 North Dakota State Bison men's basketball team represented North Dakota State University in the 2017–18 NCAA Division I men's basketball season. The Bison, led by fourth-year head coach David Richman, played their home games at the Scheels Center in Fargo, North Dakota as members of the Summit League. They finished the season 15–17, 5–9 in Summit League play to finish in a tie for fifth place. They defeated Fort Wayne in the quarterfinals of the Summit League tournament before losing in the semifinals to South Dakota State.

Previous season
The Bison finished the season 19–11, 11–5 in Summit League play to finish in second place. They were upset by IUPUI in the quarterfinals of the Summit League tournament.

Preseason 
In a poll of league coaches, media, and sports information directors, the Bison were picked to finish in third place. Senior guard Paul Miller was named to the preseason All-Summit First Team.

Roster

Schedule and results

|-
!colspan=9 style=| Exhibition

|-
!colspan=9 style=| Regular season

|-
!colspan=9 style=| The Summit League tournament

Source

References

North Dakota State Bison men's basketball seasons
North Dakota State
Bison
Bison